In capital punishment, a volunteer is a prisoner who wishes to be sentenced to death. Often, volunteers will waive all appeals in an attempt to expedite the sentence. In the United States, execution volunteers constitute approximately 10% of prisoners on death row. Volunteers can sometimes bypass legal procedures which are designed to designate the death penalty for the most serious offenders. Other prisoners have killed in prison with the desire of receiving the death sentence. Opponents of execution volunteering cited the prevalence of mental illness among volunteers comparing it to a form of suicide. Execution volunteering has received considerably less attention and effort at legal reform than those who were exonerated after execution.

History
Since the 1976 reinstatement of capital punishment in the United States, there have been at least 150 documented cases of execution volunteers. The first documented case since 1976 was of Gary Gilmore in 1977 who "withdrew his rights of appeal from Utah’s legal system and requested that the courts enforce his death sentence as soon as possible".

In 1996, Robert South decided to waive his right to appeal due to a benign tumor which "significantly disrupted his sleep cycle, made him extremely sensitive to noise, and caused frequent and severe headaches". He had also suffered from chronic post-traumatic stress disorder.

In 2013, Robert Gleason was executed after killing two inmates in prison while serving a life sentence for a murder committed in 2007. After killing the first inmate, Gleason said he would not stop killing until he received the death sentence.

In 2016, Scott Dozier voluntarily waived his appeals and wrote a letter to District Judge Jennifer Togliatti asking her to expedite his execution. Dozier committed suicide on January 5, 2019 after repeated stays of execution.

Studies
John Blume of a professor Cornell Law School published an article in the Michigan Law Review which examined the relationship between "volunteering" for execution and suicide. Blume found a strong correlation between volunteering and mental illness. According to Blume "nearly 88% of all death row inmates who have 'volunteered' for execution have struggled with mental illness and/or substance abuse".

References

Volunteer execution
Capital punishment
Assisted suicide